Badwater may refer to:

 Badwater Basin, Death Valley, California; the lowest elevation point in North America
 Badwater, California, an unincorporated community located near the basin
 Badwater Ultramarathon, run between the basin and the slopes of Mount Whitney